The 1989–90 Minnesota Golden Gophers men's basketball team represented the University of Minnesota during the 1989–90 NCAA Division I men's basketball season. Led by fourth-year head coach Clem Haskins, the Golden Gophers advanced to the Elite 8 of the NCAA tournament and finished with a 23–9 record (11–7 Big Ten).

Roster

Schedule/results

|-
!colspan=8 style=| Regular season
|-

|-
!colspan=8 style=| NCAA Tournament

Rankings

NBA draft

References

Minnesota Golden Gophers men's basketball seasons
Minnesota
Minnesota
1989 in sports in Minnesota
1990 in sports in Minnesota